802 Epyaxa, provisional designation , is a stony Florian asteroid from the inner regions of the asteroid belt, approximately 7.5 kilometers in diameter. It was discovered by German astronomer Max Wolf at the Heidelberg Observatory in southern Germany, on 20 March 1915.

Description 

The S-type asteroid is a member of the Flora family, one of the largest groups of stony asteroids in the main-belt. It orbits the Sun at a distance of 2.0–2.4 AU once every 3 years and 3 months (1,189 days). Its orbit shows an eccentricity of 0.08 and is tilted by 5 degrees to the plane of the ecliptic. From 2009 to 2014, seven photometric lightcurve analysis rendered a well-defined, concurring rotation period of 4.39 hours (also see adjunct infobox).

According to the survey carried out by the U.S. Wide-field Infrared Survey Explorer with its NEOWISE mission, the asteroid's surface has a relatively high albedo of 0.29, while the Collaborative Asteroid Lightcurve Link assumes a more moderate value of 0.24, which is also identical to the albedo of the Flora family's namesake, the asteroid 8 Flora.

This minor planet was named after Epyaxa (Ἐπύαξα), wife of King Syennesis and queen of the Kingdom of Cilicia in South Asia Minor in the 5th century BCE. The couple supported the revolt of Cyrus the Younger against his brother Artaxerxes II of Persia, after whom the minor planet 7212 Artaxerxes is named. Epyaxa had her own army and her own lavish budget to spend. Her Kingdom lost its independence and became a Persian satrapy of the Achaemenid Empire after the defeat of Cyrus.

References

External links 
 Lightcurve plot of 802 Epyaxa, Palmer Divide Observatory, B. D. Warner (2011)
 Asteroid Lightcurve Database (LCDB), query form (info )
 Dictionary of Minor Planet Names, Google books
 Asteroids and comets rotation curves, CdR – Observatoire de Genève, Raoul Behrend
 Discovery Circumstances: Numbered Minor Planets (1)-(5000) – Minor Planet Center
 
 

000802
Discoveries by Max Wolf
Named minor planets
000802
19150320